Rundy Cup Mountain is a mountain in Schoharie County, New York. It is located northeast of Middleburgh. The Cliff is located southwest and Zimmer Hill is located east of Rundy Cup Mountain.

References

Mountains of Schoharie County, New York
Mountains of New York (state)